Anarchism in the Dominican Republic first surfaced in the late 19th century, as part of the nascent workers' movement.

History
In the 1880s and 1890s, Spanish immigrant workers brought anarchism to the Dominican Republic. In 1884, the mutualist association La Alianza Cibaeña was founded. This was followed by the Sociedad Artesenal Hijos del Pueblo in 1890. In 1897, the Unión de Panaderos de Santo Domingo was founded, becoming the country's first trade union. Bakers, cobblers, and bricklayers led the country's first wave of strikes, protesting in Parque Colon against their respective employers. In the 1920s, after the occupation had ended and the Third Republic was established, the Federación Local del Trabajo de Santo Domingo was founded. However, in 1930 Rafael Trujillo seized power from the democratically-elected government of Horacio Vásquez in a coup d'état, establishing a right-wing dictatorship which suppressed all political opposition - including the anarchist movement.

On March 21, 2015, the Anarchist Federation of Central America and the Caribbean (FACC) held its founding congress in Santiago de los Caballeros, hosted by the Dominican anarchist organization Kiskeya Libertaria.

References

Bibliography 

 
Anarchism by country
Anarchism